At the 1972 Summer Olympics in Munich, 38 events in athletics were contested, 24 for men and 14 for women. There were a total number of 1324 participating athletes from 104 countries.

Medal summary

Men

Women

Medal table

References
Athletics Australia

 
1972
1972 Summer Olympics events
O
International athletics competitions hosted by West Germany